Strafe refers to strafing, the military practice of attacking ground targets from low-flying aircraft.

Strafe may also refer to:

Strafe (Transformers), character from the Transformers series
Strafe (video game), 2017 video game
Strafe (band), hip-hop group

See also
Strafing (video games), the act of moving sideways in a video game, typically either in relation to an enemy or the game's camera